Wardington Manor lies between Lower and Upper Wardington in Oxfordshire. The house dates from the middle of the 16th century or possibly earlier. The house was remodelled in 1665 and twice early in the 20th century.

From 1917, Wardington Manor was the seat of John Pease, 1st Baron Wardington, and later Christopher Pease, 2nd Baron Wardington (1924-2005), and his wife Audrey White (1927–2014).

On April 16, 2004, the house was severely damaged by fire, mostly affecting the roof but has since been restored. It is a Grade II* listed building.

References

Grade II* listed houses
Grade II* listed buildings in Oxfordshire
Houses completed in 1665
Houses in Oxfordshire
1665 establishments in England